The 2013 Madrid Open (also known as the Mutua Madrid Open for sponsorship reasons) was a professional tennis tournament played on outdoor clay courts at the Park Manzanares in Madrid, Spain from 6–12 May. It was the 12th edition of the event on the ATP World Tour and 5th on the WTA Tour. It was classified as an ATP World Tour Masters 1000 event on the 2013 ATP World Tour and a Premier Mandatory event on the 2013 WTA Tour.

Ion Țiriac the former Romanian ATP player and now billionaire businessman is the current owner of the tournament.

Points and prize money

Point distribution

Prize money

ATP singles main-draw entrants

Seeds

Rankings are as of 29 April 2013.

Other entrants
The following players received wildcards into the main draw:
  Pablo Andújar
  Marius Copil
  Javier Martí
  Tommy Robredo

The following players received entry from the qualifying draw:
  Guillermo García López
  Santiago Giraldo
  Robin Haase
  Tobias Kamke
  Jesse Levine
  Xavier Malisse
  João Souza

The following player received entry as lucky loser:
  Marinko Matosevic

Withdrawals
Before the tournament
  Thomaz Bellucci (abdominal injury)
  Juan Martín del Potro (virus)
  Mardy Fish
  Philipp Kohlschreiber

Retirements
  Tobias Kamke (right hip injury)

ATP doubles main-draw entrants

Seeds

Rankings are as of 29 April 2013.

Other entrants
The following pairs received wildcards into the doubles main draw:
  Nicolás Almagro /  Oliver Marach
  Daniel Gimeno Traver /  Daniel Muñoz de la Nava
The following pair received entry as alternates:
  Juan Mónaco /  Horacio Zeballos

Withdrawals
Before the tournament
  Santiago González (illness)

Retirements
  Nicolás Almagro (left hip injury)

WTA singles main-draw entrants

Seeds

Rankings are as of 29 April 2013.

Other entrants
The following players received wildcards into the main draw:
  Lourdes Domínguez Lino
  Simona Halep
  Daniela Hantuchová
  Anabel Medina Garrigues
  Sílvia Soler Espinosa

The following players received entry from the qualifying draw:
  Alexandra Dulgheru
  Camila Giorgi
  Bethanie Mattek-Sands
  Christina McHale
  Yulia Putintseva
  Chanelle Scheepers
  María Teresa Torró Flor
  Lesia Tsurenko

The following players received entry as lucky losers:
  Madison Keys
  Stefanie Vögele

Withdrawals
Before the tournament
  Tamira Paszek (respiratory infection)
  Venus Williams (back injury)
  Heather Watson (mononucleosis)
During the tournament
  Julia Görges
  Yaroslava Shvedova (right arm injury)

Retirements
  Ayumi Morita (left abductor strain)
  Elena Vesnina (lumbar spine injury)
  Klára Zakopalová (asthma)

WTA doubles main-draw entrants

Seeds

Rankings are as of 29 April 2013.

Other entrants
The following pairs received wildcards into the doubles main draw:
  Alizé Cornet /  Francesca Schiavone
  Jelena Janković /  Mirjana Lučić-Baroni
  Garbiñe Muguruza /  María Teresa Torró Flor
  Sílvia Soler Espinosa /  Carla Suárez Navarro
The following pair received entry as alternates:
  Sofia Arvidsson /  Johanna Larsson

Withdrawals
Before the tournament
  Monica Niculescu (right shoulder injury)
  Tamira Paszek (respiratory infection)

Finals

Men's singles

 Rafael Nadal defeated  Stanislas Wawrinka, 6–2, 6–4

Women's singles

 Serena Williams defeated  Maria Sharapova, 6–1, 6–4

Men's doubles

 Bob Bryan /  Mike Bryan defeated  Alexander Peya /  Bruno Soares, 6–2, 6–3

Women's doubles

 Anastasia Pavlyuchenkova /  Lucie Šafářová defeated  Cara Black /  Marina Erakovic, 6–2, 6–4

References

External links
 Official website